AAZ-A-154 is a  novel isotryptamine derivative which acts as a 5-HT2A receptor agonist discovered and synthesized by the lab of Professor David E. Olson at UCDavis. Animal studies suggest that it produces antidepressant effects without the psychedelic action typical of drugs from this class. In tests, AAZ-A-154 had antidepressant effects in mice without causing the head-twitch response linked to hallucinogenic effects. Due to the rapidly-induced and enduring neuroplasticity, AAZ-A-154 is a member of the class of compounds known as non-hallucinogenic psychoplastogens. This compound, as well as related compounds, are licensed by Delix Therapeutics and are being developed as potential medicines for neuropsychiatric disorders.

See also
 α,N,N-Trimethyltryptamine
 5-MeO-DMT
 6-Fluoro-DET
 AL-34662
 IHCH-7113
 (R)-69
 Neuroplasticity
 Psychoplastogen
 Delix Therapeutics
 David E. Olson

References 

Designer drugs
Indoles
Methoxy compounds
Dimethylamino compounds